Mathematical Markup Language (MathML) is a mathematical markup language, an application of XML for describing mathematical notations and capturing both its structure and content, and is one of a number of mathematical markup languages. Its aim is to natively integrate mathematical formulae into World Wide Web pages and other documents. It is part of HTML5 and is a ISO/IEC standard ISO/IEC 40314 since 2015.

History

Following some experiments in the Arena browser based on proposals for mathematical markup in HTML, MathML 1 was released as a W3C recommendation in April 1998 as the first XML language to be recommended by the W3C. Version 1.01 of the format was released in July 1999 and version 2.0 appeared in February 2001. Implementations of the specification appeared in Mozilla 1.0 and Opera 9.5. In October 2003, the second edition of MathML Version 2.0 was published as the final release by the W3C Math Working Group.

MathML was originally designed before the finalization of XML namespaces. However, it was assigned a namespace immediately after the Namespace Recommendation was completed, and for XML use, the elements should be in the namespace with namespace URL http://www.w3.org/1998/Math/MathML. When MathML is used in HTML (as opposed to XML) this namespace is automatically inferred by the HTML parser and need not be specified in the document.

MathML version 3
Version 3 of the MathML specification was released as a W3C recommendation on 20 October 2010. A recommendation of A MathML for CSS Profile was later released on 7 June 2011; this is a subset of MathML suitable for CSS formatting. Another subset, Strict Content MathML, provides a subset of content MathML with a uniform structure and is designed to be compatible with OpenMath. Other content elements are defined in terms of a transformation to the strict subset. New content elements include  which associates bound variables to expressions, for example a summation index. The new  element allows structure sharing.

The development of MathML 3.0 went through a number of stages. In June 2006 the W3C rechartered the MathML Working Group to produce a MathML 3 Recommendation until February 2008 and in November 2008 extended the charter to April 2010.  A sixth Working Draft of the MathML 3 revision was published in June 2009. On 10 August 2010 version 3 graduated to become a "Proposed Recommendation" rather than a draft. An implementation of MathML 2 landed in WebKit around this same time, with a Chromium implementation following a couple of years later, although that implementation was removed from Chromium after less than a year.

The Second Edition of MathML 3.0 was published as a W3C Recommendation on 10 April 2014. The specification was approved as an ISO/IEC international standard 40314:2015 on 23 June 2015. Also in 2015, the MathML Association was founded to support the adoption of the MathML standard. At that time, according to a member of the MathJax team, none of the major browser makers paid any of their developers for any MathML-rendering work; whatever support existed was overwhelmingly the result of unpaid volunteer time/work.

MathML Core
In August 2021, a new specification called MathML Core was published, described as the “core subset of Mathematical Markup Language, or MathML, that is suitable for browser implementation.” MathML Core set itself apart from MathML 3.0 by including detailed rendering rules and integration with CSS, automated browser support testing resources, and focusing on a fundamental subset of MathML. An implementation was added to Chromium at the beginning of 2023.

Presentation and semantics
MathML deals not only with the presentation but also the meaning of formula components (the latter part of MathML is known as "Content MathML"). Because the meaning of the equation is preserved separate from the presentation, how the content is communicated can be left up to the user. For example, web pages with MathML embedded in them can be viewed as normal web pages with many browsers, but visually impaired users can also have the same MathML read to them through the use of screen readers (e.g. using the MathPlayer plugin for Internet Explorer or Firefox, Opera 9.50 build 9656+ or the Fire Vox extension for Firefox).  Newer versions of JAWS support MathML voicing as well as braille output.

Presentation MathML
Presentation MathML focuses on the display of an equation, and has about 30 elements. A Presentation MathML expression is built up out of tokens that are combined using higher-level elements, which control their layout (there are also about 50 attributes, which mainly control fine details).

Token elements generally only contain characters (not other elements). They include:
  – identifiers;
  – operators;
  – numbers.
  – text.

Note, however, that these token elements may be used as extension points, allowing markup in host languages.

These are combined using layout elements, that generally contain only elements. They include:
  – a horizontal row of items;
  – fractions;
  and  – roots;
  – surrounding content with fences, such as parentheses.

They are:
 ;
 ;
 ;
 .

The full specification of MathML entities is closely coordinated with the corresponding specifications for use with HTML and XML in general.

Thus, the expression  requires two layout elements: one to create the overall horizontal row and one for the superscripted exponent. Including only the layout elements and the (not yet marked up) bare tokens, the structure looks like this:

  <mrow>
    a &InvisibleTimes; <msup>x 2</msup>
    + b &InvisibleTimes; x
    + c
  </mrow>

However, the individual tokens also have to be identified as identifiers (mi), operators (mo), or numbers (mn). Adding the token markup, the full form ends up as

  <mrow>
    <mi>a</mi> <mo>&InvisibleTimes;</mo> <msup><mi>x</mi><mn>2</mn></msup>
    <mo>+</mo><mi>b</mi><mo>&InvisibleTimes;</mo><mi>x</mi>
    <mo>+</mo><mi>c</mi>
  </mrow>

A valid MathML document typically consists of the XML declaration, DOCTYPE declaration, and document element.
The document body then contains MathML expressions which appear in <math> elements as needed in the document. Often, MathML will be embedded in more general documents, such as HTML, DocBook, or other XML schemas. A complete document that consists of just the MathML example above, is shown here:

<?xml version="1.0" encoding="UTF-8"?>
<!DOCTYPE math PUBLIC "-//W3C//DTD MathML 2.0//EN"
         "http://www.w3.org/Math/DTD/mathml2/mathml2.dtd">
<math xmlns="http://www.w3.org/1998/Math/MathML">
  <mrow>
    <mi>a</mi> <mo>&InvisibleTimes;</mo> <msup><mi>x</mi><mn>2</mn></msup>
    <mo>+</mo><mi>b</mi><mo>&InvisibleTimes;</mo><mi>x</mi>
    <mo>+</mo><mi>c</mi>
  </mrow>
</math>

Content MathML
Content MathML focuses on the semantics, or meaning, of the expression rather than its layout. Central to Content MathML is the  element that represents function application. The function being applied is the first child element under , and its operands or parameters are the remaining child elements. Content MathML uses only a few attributes.

There are over a hundred different elements for different functions and operators.

For example,  represents  and  represents . The elements representing operators and functions are empty elements, because their operands are the other elements under the containing .

The expression  could be represented as

<math>
    <apply>
        <plus/>
        <apply>
            <times/>
            <ci>a</ci>
            <apply>
                <power/>
                <ci>x</ci>
                <cn>2</cn>
            </apply>
        </apply>
        <apply>
            <times/>
            <ci>b</ci>
            <ci>x</ci>
        </apply>
        <ci>c</ci>
    </apply>
</math>

Content MathML is nearly isomorphic to expressions in a functional language such as Scheme and other dialects of Lisp.  amounts to Scheme's , and the many operator and function elements amount to Scheme functions. With this trivial literal transformation, plus un-tagging the individual tokens, the example above becomes:
(plus
  (times a (power x 2))
  (times b x)
  c)
This reflects the long-known close relationship between XML element structures, and LISP or Scheme S-expressions.

Wikidata annotation in Content MathML

According to the OM Society, OpenMath Content Dictionaries can be employed as collections of symbols and identifiers with declarations of their semanticsnames, descriptions and rules. A 2018 paper presented at the SIGIR conference proposed that the semantic knowledge base Wikidata could be used as an OpenMath Content Dictionary to link semantic elements of a mathematical formula to unique and language-independent Wikidata items.

Example and comparison to other formats
The well-known quadratic formula:
 

would be marked up using LaTeX syntax like this:
x = \frac{-b \pm \sqrt{b^2 - 4ac}}{2a}
in troff/eqn like this:
 x = {-b +- sqrt{b sup 2 – 4ac}} over 2a
in Apache OpenOffice Math and LibreOffice Math like this (all three are valid):
 x = {-b plusminus sqrt {b^2 – 4 ac}} over {2 a}
 x = {-b +- sqrt {b^2 – 4ac}} over {2a}
 x = {-b ± sqrt {b^2 – 4ac}} over {2a}
in AsciiMath like this:
 x = (-b +- sqrt(b^2 - 4ac))/(2a)
The above equation could be represented in Presentation MathML as an expression tree made up from layout elements like mfrac or msqrt elements:
<math mode="display" xmlns="http://www.w3.org/1998/Math/MathML">
 <semantics>
  <mrow>
    <mi>x</mi>
    <mo>=</mo>
    <mfrac>
      <mrow>
        <mo form="prefix">−</mo>
        <mi>b</mi>
        <mo>&pm;</mo>
        <msqrt>
          <msup><mi>b</mi><mn>2</mn></msup>
          <mo>−</mo>
          <mn>4</mn><mo>&it;</mo><mi>a</mi><mo>&it;</mo><mi>c</mi>
        </msqrt>
      </mrow>
      <mrow>
        <mn>2</mn>
        <mo>&it;</mo>
        <mi>a</mi>
      </mrow>
    </mfrac>
  </mrow>
  <annotation encoding="application/x-tex"><!-- TeX -->
     x = \frac{-b\pm\sqrt{b^2-4ac}}{2a}
  </annotation>
  <annotation encoding="StarMath 5.0">
     x = {-b plusminus sqrt {b^2 - 4 ac}} over {2 a}
  </annotation>
  <!-- More annotations can be written: application/x-troff-eqn for eqn, application/x-asciimath for AsciiMath... -->
  <!-- Semantic MathML go under <annotation-xml encoding="MathML-Content">. -->
 </semantics>
</math>

This example uses the  element, which can be used to embed a semantic annotation in non-XML format, for example to store the formula in the format used by an equation editor such as StarMath or the markup using LaTeX syntax. The  field is usually a MIME type, although most of the equation encodings don't have such a registration; freeform text may be used in such case.

Although less compact than TeX, the XML structuring promises to make it widely usable, allows instant display in applications such as Web browsers, and facilitates an interpretation of its meaning in mathematical software products. MathML is not intended to be written or edited directly by humans.

Embedding MathML in HTML/XHTML files

MathML, being XML, can be embedded inside other XML files such as XHTML files using XML namespaces. Browsers such as Firefox 3+ and Opera 9.6+ (support incomplete) can display Presentation MathML embedded in XHTML.

<?xml version="1.0" encoding="UTF-8"?>
<!DOCTYPE html  PUBLIC "-//W3C//DTD XHTML 1.1 plus MathML 2.0//EN"
  "http://www.w3.org/Math/DTD/mathml2/xhtml-math11-f.dtd">
<html xmlns="http://www.w3.org/1999/xhtml" xml:lang="en">
  <head>
    <title>Example of MathML embedded in an XHTML file</title>
    <meta name="description" content="Example of MathML embedded in an XHTML file"/>
  </head>
  <body>
    <h1>Example of MathML embedded in an XHTML file</h1>
    <p>
      The area of a circle is 
      <math xmlns="http://www.w3.org/1998/Math/MathML">
        <mi>π<!-- π --></mi>
        <mo>⁢<!-- &InvisibleTimes; --></mo>
        <msup>
          <mi>r</mi>
          <mn>2</mn>
        </msup>
      </math>.
    </p>
  </body>
</html>

Inline MathML is also supported in HTML5 files in the current versions of WebKit (Safari and JavaFX/WebView ), Gecko (Firefox). There is no need to specify namespaces like in the XHTML.

<!DOCTYPE html>
<html lang="en">
  <head>
    <meta charset="utf-8">
    <title>Example of MathML embedded in an HTML5 file</title>
  </head>
  <body>
    <h1>Example of MathML embedded in an HTML5 file</h1>
    <p>
      The area of a circle is 
      <math>
        <mi>π</mi>
        <mo>&InvisibleTimes;</mo>
        <msup>
          <mi>r</mi>
          <mn>2</mn>
        </msup>
      </math>.
    </p>
  </body>
</html>

Browser support

Of the major web browsers, Gecko-based browsers (e.g., Firefox) have the most complete native support for MathML.

While the WebKit layout engine has a development version of MathML, this feature is only available in version 5.1 and higher of Safari.  It was available in Chrome up through  Chrome 24 at which point it was removed. At the time, Google removed support of MathML claiming architectural security issues and low usage did not justify their engineering time. In January 2023, support for MathML was reintroduced to Chrome in version 109 due to work by Igalia. , the WebKit/Safari implementation has numerous bugs.

JavaFX/WebView. Also based on WebKit, the JavaFX embedded web browser supports MathML starting with JavaFX 8 Update 192 and JavaFX 11 versions. Support is broken, in JavaFX 8 previous versions, JavaFX 9 and JavaFX 10.

Opera, between version 9.5 and 12, supports MathML for CSS profile, but is unable to position diacritical marks properly. Prior to version 9.5 it required User JavaScript or custom stylesheets to emulate MathML support. Starting with Opera 14, Opera drops support for MathML by switching to the Chromium 25 engine.

Microsoft Edge does not support MathML, nor are there plans to add support.

Internet Explorer does not support MathML natively. Support for IE6 through IE9 can be added by installing the MathPlayer plugin. IE10 has some crashing bugs with MathPlayer and Microsoft decided to completely disable in IE11 the binary plug-in interface that MathPlayer needs. MathPlayer has a license that may limit its use or distribution in commercial webpages and software.  Using or distributing the MathPlayer plugin to display HTML content via the WebBrowser control in commercial software may also be forbidden by this license.

The KHTML-based Konqueror currently does not provide support for MathML.

The quality of rendering of MathML in a browser depends on the installed fonts. The STIX Fonts project have released a comprehensive set of mathematical fonts under an open license. The Cambria Math font supplied with Microsoft Windows had a slightly more limited support.

Other standards
Another standard called OpenMath that has been designed (largely by the same people who devised Content MathML) more specifically for storing formulae semantically can also be used to complement MathML. OpenMath data can be embedded in MathML using the  element. OpenMath content dictionaries can be used to define the meaning of  elements. The following would define P1(x) to be the first Legendre polynomial
<apply>
  <csymbol encoding="OpenMath" definitionURL="http://www.openmath.org/cd/contrib/cd/orthpoly1.xhtml#legendreP">
    <msub><mi>P</mi><mn>1</mn></msub>
  </csymbol>
  <ci>x</ci>
</apply>

The OMDoc format has been created for markup of larger mathematical structures than formulae, from statements like definitions, theorems, proofs, or example, to theories and text books. Formulae in OMDoc documents can either be written in Content MathML or in OpenMath; for presentation, they are converted to Presentation MathML.

The ISO/IEC standard Office Open XML (OOXML) defines a different XML math syntax, derived from Microsoft Office products. However, it is partially compatible through relatively simple XSL Transformations.

See also 
 CSS
 List of document markup languages
 Comparison of document markup languages
 Formula editors
 LaTeX2HTML
 LaTeXML
 KaTeXJavaScript library that converts LaTeX to MathML
 MathJaxJavaScript library that converts LaTeX to MathML

Notes

References

Further reading

Specifications 
 W3C Recommendation: Mathematical Markup Language (MathML) 1.01 Specification
 W3C Recommendation: Mathematical Markup Language (MathML) Version 2.0 (Second Edition)
 W3C Recommendation: Mathematical Markup Language (MathML) Version 3.0 (Third Edition)

External links 
 W3C Math Home – Contains the specifications, a FAQ, and a list of supporting software.
 
 web-xslt, a collection of XSLT programs for handling MathML (e.g. converting Content MathML to Presentation MathML, converting Presentation MathML to TeX)

 
Mathematical markup languages
XML markup languages
XML-based standards
World Wide Web Consortium standards
Articles with example Scheme (programming language) code